León is a city and municipality of Spain, capital of the province of León, part of the autonomous community of Castile and León, in the northwest of the Iberian Peninsula. It has a population of 124,303 (2019), by far the largest municipality in the province. The population of the metropolitan area, including the neighbouring San Andrés del Rabanedo and other smaller municipalities, accounts for around 200,000 inhabitants.

Founded as the military encampment of the Legio VI Victrix around 29 BC, its standing as an encampment city was consolidated with the definitive settlement of the Legio VII Gemina from 74 AD. Following its partial depopulation due to the Umayyad conquest of the peninsula, 910 saw the beginning of one its most prominent historical periods, when it became the capital of the Kingdom of León, which took active part in the Reconquista against the Moors, and came to be one of the fundamental kingdoms of medieval Spain.

In 1188, the city hosted the first Parliament in European history under the reign of Alfonso IX, due to which it was named in 2010, by the professor John Keane, the King of Spain and the Junta of Castile and León, as the cradle of Parliamentarism, and the Decreta of León were included in the Memory of the World register by UNESCO in 2013. The city's prominence began to decline in the early Middle Ages, partly due to the loss of independence after the union of the Leonese kingdom with the Crown of Castile, consolidated in 1301.

After a period of stagnation during the early modern age, it was one of the first cities to hold an uprising in the Spanish War of Independence, and some years later, in 1833 acquired the status of provincial capital. The end of the 19th and the 20th century saw a significant acceleration in the rate of urban expansion, when the city became an important communications hub of the northwest due to the rise of the coal mining industry and the arrival of the railroad.

León's historical and architectural heritage, as well as the numerous festivals hosted throughout the year (particularly noteworthy are the Easter processions) and its location on the French Way of the Camino de Santiago, which is ranked as a UNESCO World Heritage Site, make it a destination of both domestic and international tourism. Some of the city's most prominent historical buildings are the Cathedral, one of the finest examples of French-style classic Gothic architecture in Spain, the Basilica of San Isidoro, one of the most important Romanesque churches in Spain and resting place of León's medieval monarchs, the Monastery of San Marcos, an example of plateresque and Renaissance Spanish architecture, and the Casa Botines, a Modernist creation of the architect Antoni Gaudí. An example of modern architecture is the city's Museum of Contemporary Art or MUSAC.

History

Roman origins
León was founded in the 1st century BC by the Roman legion Legio VI Victrix, which served under Caesar Augustus during the Cantabrian Wars (29-19 BC), the final stage of the Roman conquest of Hispania. In the year 74 AD, the Legio VII Gemina —recruited from the Hispanics by Galba in 69 AD— settled in a permanent military camp that was the origin of the city. Its modern name, León, is derived from the city's Latin name Castra Legionis.

The Romans established the site of the city to protect the recently conquered territories of northwestern Hispania from the Astures and Cantabri, and to secure the transport of gold extracted in the province —especially in the huge nearby mines of Las Médulas— that was taken to Rome through Asturica Augusta (modern-day Astorga).

Tacitus calls the legion Galbiana, to distinguish it from the old Legio VII Claudia, but this appellation is not found on any inscriptions. It appears to have received the appellation of Gemina on account of its amalgamation by Vespasian with one of the German legions, probably the Legio I Germanica. Its full name was Legio VII Gemina Felix. After serving in Pannonia, and in the civil wars, it was settled by Vespasian in Hispania Tarraconensis, to supply the place of the Legio VI Victrix and Legio X Gemina, two of the three legions ordinarily stationed in the province, but which had been withdrawn to Germany.

That its regular winter quarters, under later emperors, were at León, we learn from the Itinerary, Ptolemy, and the Notitiae Imperii, as well as from a few inscriptions; but there are numerous inscriptions to prove that a strong detachment of it was stationed at Tarraco (modern Tarragona), the chief city of the province.

Some elements of the original Roman encampment still survive in the modern city layout. Long sections of the Roman walls (built between the first century BC and the fourth century AD) are still standing. There are also archaeological exhibitions showing remains of the walls, gates, baths and an amphitheatre.

Middle Ages
The post-Roman history of the city is largely the history of the Kingdom of León. The station of the legion in the territory of the Astures grew into an important city, which resisted the attacks of the Visigoths until AD 586, when it was taken by Leovigild; and it was one of the few cities which the Visigoths allowed to retain their fortifications.

During the Umayyad conquest of Hispania, in 715 Tariq advanced from the area of La Rioja towards Astorga and León. The same fortress, which the Romans had built to protect the plain from the incursions of the mountaineers, became the advanced post which covered the mountain, as the last refuge of Cisastur Tribes. However, there is no notice of resistance whatsoever. An attempt was made by the invaders to settle the strongholds with Berbers came in a military capacity, but the scheme was abandoned when the Berbers of northern Iberia rebelled against the Arabs and gave up their positions to join the revolt around 740.

Towards the year 846, a group of Mozarabs (Christians who did not flee from the Muslims and lived under the Muslim regime) tried to repopulate the city, but a Muslim attack prevented that initiative. In the year 856, under the Christian king Ordoño I, another attempt at repopulation was made and was successful. Alfonso III of León and García I of León made León city the capital of the Kingdom of León and the most important of the Christian cities in Iberia.

The seat of the kingdom of Asturias moved to León in 910.

Sacked by Almanzor in about 987, the city was reconstructed and repopulated by Alfonso V, whose Decree of 1017 regulated its economic life, including the functioning of its markets. León was a way-station for pilgrims on the Camino de Santiago leading to Santiago de Compostela. With Alfonso V of León the city had the "Fueru de Llión", an important letter of privileges.

In 1188, Alfonso IX of León gathered the three estates in the city of León (including representatives of the urban class) in the Cortes of León of 1188. Due to the written documentary corpus, the 1188 Cortes were recognised by the UNESCO in 2013 as "cradle" of parliamentarism.

Suburbs for traders and artisans sprang up, who, after the 13th century, began to influence the municipal government. During the early Middle Ages, the livestock industry produced a period of prosperity for the city.

Free from the seigneuralisation process of the Late Middle Ages, towards the end of the era León had consolidated as one of the 13 cities in the Meseta enjoying the right to vote at the Cortes of Castile.

Modern history

In the 16th century, economic and demographic decline set in and continued until the 19th century. For the extent of the Early Modern period the city remained controlled by a reduced set of noble families by means of the regimientos and regidurías.
The city population increased from 9,000 to 15,000 during the 19th century. The population further increased during the 20th century: 18,000 (1910), 44,000 (1940), 73,000 (1960), and 100,000 (1971).

The military coup d'état that marked the beginning of the Spanish Civil War took place (and succeeded) in León on 20 July 1936, with the putschist military officers meeting little resistance. The Catholic Church adhered to the rebels and instrumentalised the Catholic sentiment and traditions against the Republic. The rebels expanded from the city to the rest of the traditionally conservative province, which remained under rebel control except a small northern part connected to Asturias, that became part of the battlefront until the fall of the North in October 1937. Both the Convent of San Marcos, the old Santa Ana factory and the provincial prison were nonetheless rehabilitated as mass detention camps in the city by the Francoist side.

During the 1960s, León experienced much growth due to in-migration from the rural zones of the province.

Main sights

Churches 

 León Cathedral, a rayonnant gothic building. It is one of the most relevant examples of the Gothic style in Spain, almost all of it built from 1205 to 1301.  It contains one of the most extensive and best preserved collections of medieval stained glass in Europe, with at least 1,764 square meters of surface, most of it containing the original windows. 
Basilica of San Isidoro, a highlight of Romanesque architecture in Spain. Built during the 11th and 12th centuries AD, the complex includes a subterranean Royal Pantheon with 12th century painted murals in an exceptional state of preservation.
Convent of San Marcos (currently a luxurious Parador) built from the 16th century AD to the 18th. Its most striking feature is a highly ornamental plateresque façade.
Church of San Salvador de Palat del Rey, the most ancient in the city (10th century), however with few remains of the original Pre-Romanesque building. As the name (meaning church of the "Holy Savior of the King's Palace") suggests, it once acted as royal chapel.
Church of Nuestra Señora del Merdado, from the 11th century.
Church of San Francisco, an active Catholic church, completed in 1791.
Church of San Juan y San Pedro de Renueva, dating to 1944–1970, but including an 18th-century Baroque façade taken from the ruined monastery of San Pedro de Eslonza, located about  outside the city.

Other historical buildings 
Roman Walls, built in the 1st century BC and enlarged in the 3rd and 4th centuries AD. Long sections in the Eastern and Northern sides are preserved, as well as less complete parts in the Western side and some remains surrounded by other buildings in the Southern side. Some sections of a Medieval wall built in the 13th and 14th centuries AD also exist in the Southern side. The wall can be visited in specific locations.
Casa Botines, a neogothic styled building designed by Antoni Gaudí and built in 1891-1892 (one of the three Gaudí buildings outside Catalonia).
Palacio de los Guzmanes, the site of the provincial diputación (parliament). It contains a patio in the plateresque style by Gil de Hontañón.

Palacio del Conde Luna (14th century).
Palacio de los Marqueses de Prado, a 17th-century Baroque building, currently the Hospital Nuestra Señora de Regla.

Museums 
MUSAC. It is a contemporary art museum which opened in 2005. Its design by the architectural studio Mansilla+Tuñón was awarded with the 2007 European Union Prize for Contemporary Architecture. One of the building's most distinctive features is its façade formed out of thousands of large multicolored stained-glass panels. Close to the museum is the León Auditorium, also projected by Mansilla+Tuñón, which has an equally striking presence of crisp white cubes perforated by irregularly set windows.
Museo de León, which contains a collection of prehistorical tools and art from the Roman, Medieval and Modern periods.
Museo Sierra-Pambley, a house from the Age of Enlightenment

Other areas and sights 
Plaza Mayor (main square).
Plaza del Grano.
Barrio Húmedo (the drinking and partying area).
University of León.

Folklore and customs

Leonese customs include the Semana Santa ("Holy Week"), featuring numerous processions through the centre of the city. One of them is the so-called "Procession of the Meeting", which acts out the meeting of three groups representing Saint John, the Virgin Mary and Christ, in the esplanade in front of the old council. Associated with Semana Santa is the procession called "The Burial of Genarín". Genarín was an alcoholic beggar who was hit by and killed by the first garbage truck in the city of León in the year 1929. This is a celebration of alcohol, and the main purpose of the people who attend it is getting drunk in honor to the alcoholic beggar.

The San Juan and San Pedro festivities are also remarkable, celebrated during the last week of June (between June 23 and June 29). During these days several concerts and festivals take place and the whole city is occupied by terraces and street markets where Leonese people celebrate the beginning of the summer, especially on San Juan's night (June 23) when fireworks and bonfires take place.

Districts
The city of León can be divided into more than 36 districts (barrios):

Centro or downtown
Casco Antiguo or Casco Histórico, the historical part of the city
Área 17
Armunia
Cruce de Armunia
El Crucero
El Ejido
Ensanche
Eras De Renueva
Ferral
La Asunción
La Chantría
La Lastra
La Palomera
La Sal
La Torre
La Vega
La Victoria
Las Ventas
Obra Sindical Del Hogar
Oteruelo De La Valdoncina
Paraíso-Cantinas
Patronato Viviendas Militares
Pinilla
Puente Castro
San Andrés del Rabanedo
San Claudio
San Esteban
San Lorenzo
San Mamés
San Marcelo
San Marcos
San Martín
San Pedro
Santa Ana
Santa Marina
Santa Olaja
Polígono 10
Trobajo Del Cerecedo
Trobajo Del Camino
Villabalter

Climate
León features an oceanic climate (Köppen: Cfb). Frost is common in the early hours of the morning before the dawn during the coldest days of the winter, but normally melts after sunrise. Snowfalls are not rare in the city (9 days a year), however heavy snowfalls are extremely rare.
With about 2,673 sunshine hours, the city enjoys a considerable amount of sunshine throughout the year.

Transport

Airport
León Airport (IATA: LEN) is located approximately 6 kilometres away from the city centre, in the neighbouring town of La Virgen del Camino/Valverde de la Virgen. It offers mostly domestic flights within the country. Currently two Spanish airlines operate in it: Iberia/Air Nostrum and Air Europa. Air Nostrum offers flights from and to Barcelona, Spain. During the summer months the number of available destinations increases, and flights are also offered from and to Palma de Mallorca, Spain, Tenerife, Spain, Ibiza, Spain, Menorca, Spain, Málaga, Spain and Gran Canaria, Spain.

Railway stations
León has two railway stations, León railway station on the Renfe line, and León-Matallana on the Renfe Feve lines. There are high-speed services that connect León to Madrid in approximately two hours. Other destinations directly reachable from León are Galicia (to the West), Asturias (to the North) and Valladolid (to the South-East, in the same route as Madrid).

Public transport
León has 13 city bus lines, belonging to the company Alesa, a subsidiary of ALSA. Besides the buses, there are plans to introduce tram lines in the city.

Leonese language

History
The Leonese language derives directly from Latin and developed in the Middle Ages. At this time, Leonese was the official language of the Leonese Kingdom and achieved a high codification grade in the city of Llión. The first written text in Leonese was Nodicia de Kesos (959 or 974); other works in the language include Fueru de Llión, Fueru de Salamanca, Fueru Xulgu, Códice d'Alfonsu XI, ou Disputa d'Elena y María or Llibru d'Alixandre.

Leonese is considered a seriously endangered language by UNESCO. It is almost extinct, being known and spoken by only a very few elderly people who live isolated in the mountains of the northern part of the province of León. However, people who wish to separate León from Castile and who support Leonese autonomy are trying to revive the language. León City Council and Leonese language associations like the Asociación Cultural de la Llingua Llïonesa El Fueyu are promoting its knowledge and use.

Leonese Language Day started in 2006 with the support of Leonese Provincial Government, and from 2008 the celebration is organised by the León City Council.

Teaching
At the end of the 1990s, several associations unofficially promoted Leonese language courses. In 2001, the Universidad de León (University of León) created a course for Teachers of Leonese language, and local government developed Leonese language courses for adults. The Leonese Language Teachers and Monitors Association (Asociación de Profesores y Monitores de Llingua Llïonesa) was created in 2008 and promotes Leonese language activities.

Leonese lessons in schools started in 2008, and it is currently taught in sixteen schools in León city in 2008–2009, promoted by the Leonese Local Government Department for Education. This course is for pupils in their 5th and 6th year of primary school (11- and 12-year-olds), where Leonese language is taught with Leonese culture.

More than one hundred people are studying Leonese in adult classes in 2008–2009. There are five levels for adults in the official courses developed by the Department for Leonese Culture of the Leonese City Council.

Government
The Leonese City Council was founded in 1345. It has 27 city councillors.

In the last municipal elections (26 May 2019) the results were:

 Spanish Socialist Workers Party (Partido Socialista Obrero Español, PSOE) - 30.31% of the votes and 10 councillors
 Partido Popular - 29.61% votes and 9 councillors
 Ciudadanos - 13.98% and 4 councillors
 Unión del Pueblo Leonés - 9.42% and 3 councillors
 Podemos-Equo - 5.35% and 1 councillor

The mayor is José Antonio Diez, from the PSOE.

León is in the county (comarca) of Tierras de León.

Twin towns — sister cities
León is twinned with:

 Bragança, Portugal
 Porto, Portugal
 León (Guanajuato), México
 Voronezh, Russia
 Dublin, Ireland
 Xiangtan, China
 Córdoba (Spain)
 Chartres

Food

Within the wide range of Leonese cuisine the following dishes are the most representative: cecina (cured, smoked beef meat), morcilla (a blood sausage), botillo (a dish of meat-stuffed pork intestine), garlic soup, el cocido leonés (a mix of meat with vegetables and chickpeas, served after a vegetable-vermicelli soup) and mantecadas (pastry).
Another very important part of the gastronomy of León are the tapas, which are usually given free with drinks, unlike in the rest of Spain. It is very common to go "de tapas" or "tapear" i.e. to go for a few drinks ("un corto", which is a very small beer, "una caña", which is roughly half a pint of beer or "un vino", a glass of wine, or a “butano”, a small glass of orange soda) just before lunch but more normally as a light form of dinner.

Notable people
Mario Amilivia (born 1957), mayor
Miguel Castaño (1883-1936), first democratically elected mayor
Moisés de León (1240-1305), rabbi, kabbalist, author of the Zohar.
Dolores Gortázar Serantes (1872-1936), novelist.
Buenaventura Durruti (1896–1936), anarchist leader.
Carlos Dominguez Cidon (1959-2009), chef and author.
José Luis Rodríguez Zapatero (1960-), prime minister of Spain (2004-2011).
Manuel Martínez (1974-), retired shot putter with multiple Spanish records and international victories.
Carolina Rodríguez (1986-), rhythmic gymnast of Spain’s national team who competed at 3 Olympic Games.
 Sara Llana (born 1997), rhythmic gymnast and member of Spain's national rhythmic gymnastics team.
 David Vidales (born 2002), racing driver.

See also
List of municipalities in León
Buenaventura Durruti
Himno a León

Gallery

References

Notes

External links

Basilica Saint Isidore of Leon
León City Council 
Tourism in León 
Rural Tourism in León 

 
Municipalities in the Province of León
Province of León
Populated places established in the 1st century BC
Roman legionary fortresses in Spain
Roman fortifications in Hispania Tarraconensis